Castle Pines Village, also known as The Village at Castle Pines or The Village, is an unincorporated community and a census-designated place (CDP) located in and governed by Douglas County, Colorado, United States. The CDP is a part of the Denver–Aurora–Lakewood, CO Metropolitan Statistical Area. The population of the Castle Pines Village CDP was 3,614 at the United States Census 2010. Douglas County governs the unincorporated community and the Castle Pines Metropolitan District provides services. The Castle Rock post office (Zip Code 80108) serves the area.

History
Castle Pines Village was founded as a gated residential community and lies at an elevation of  along the Front Range of the Rocky Mountains. It is the northernmost incidence of tablelands along the Front Range with views of Pikes Peak, Mount Evans and the Rocky Mountains. The community surrounds the Castle Pines Golf Club and the Country Club at Castle Pines.

Castle Pines Golf Club, founded by Jack A. Vickers and designed by Jack Nicklaus, opened in 1981.  The International professional golf tournament was an annual PGA Tour event contested at Castle Pines Golf Club from 1986 through 2006.

On September 11, 2018, the Castle Pines Homes Association changed the name of the community to The Village at Castle Pines to better distinguish the community from the neighboring areas.

Geography
Castle Pines Village is bordered to the north by the City of Castle Pines and to the south by the town of Castle Rock, the Douglas County seat. The community surrounds the Castle Pines Golf Club and the Country Club at Castle Pines.

Demographics

As of the ACS of 2011-2013, there were 3,973 people, 1,330 households, and 1,164 families residing in the community. There were 1,453 housing units. The racial makeup of the community was 93.9% White, 5.8% Asian, and 0.3% African American. Hispanics and Latinos of any race were 0.6% of the population.

The ACS estimated that there were 1,330 households, out of which 37.6% had children under the age of 18 living with them, 86.8% were married couples living together, 0.0% had a male householder with no wife present, 0.7% had a female householder with no husband present, and 12.5% were non-families. 11.1% of all households were made up of individuals, and 1.4% had someone living alone who was 65 years of age or older. The average household size was 2.65, and the average family size was 2.86.

In the community, the population's estimated distribution of age was spread out, with 23.3% under the age of 18, 3.8% from 18 to 24, 16.1% from 25 to 44, 42.5% from 45 to 64, and 14.3% who were 65 years of age or older. The median age was 49.6 years. The gender makeup of the community was 47.1% male and 52.9% female.

The estimated median annual income for a household in the community over the period 2007-2011 was $208,008, and the median income for a family was $209,915. Males had a median income of $208,654 versus $109,118 for females. The per capita income for the town was $118,043. No families and 0.5% of the population were below the poverty line, including none of those under age 18 and 1.8% of those age 65 or over.

Education
The Douglas County School District serves Castle Pines Village.

Economy
For the period 2007–2011, the American Community Survey estimated that 59.0% of the population over the age of 16 was in the labor force. 0.0% was in the armed forces, and 59.0% was in the civilian labor force with 56.8% employed and 2.2% unemployed. The composition, by occupation, of the employed civilian labor force was:  61.1% in management, business, science, and arts; 32.0% in sales and office occupations; 4.1% in service occupations; 1.9% in production, transportation, and material moving; 0.9% in natural resources, construction, and maintenance. The three industries employing the largest percentages of the working civilian labor force were:  professional, scientific, and management, and administrative and waste management services (19.2%); finance and insurance, and real estate and rental and leasing (18.7%); and educational services, health care, and social assistance (15.3).

The estimated median home value in the community between 2007 and 2011 was $935,100, the median selected monthly owner cost was $4,000+ for housing units with a mortgage and $1,000+ for those without, and the median gross rent was $2,000+.

Government
Castle Pines Village is an unincorporated area of Douglas County, Colorado, officially represented by a county commissioner.

Castle Pines Homes Association (CPHA), established in 1981, is the homeowners association that manages the community through a five-member board of directors funded by dues and assessments. Police and fire services for the community are provided by Douglas County and South Metro Fire Rescue and are supplemented by Castle Pines Emergency Services, the Emergency Services department of the CPHA.

Infrastructure

Transportation
Castle Pines Village is located west of Interstate 25. The city is served by Denver International Airport and nearby Centennial Airport.

Utilities
Castle Pines Metropolitan District, established in 1973, is the special district that provides water supply, wastewater treatment, storm drainage, and street improvements to the community and is governed by an elected five-member board of directors.

Notable residents
Garrett Atkins (1979 - ), former MLB player
Fred Bartlit, Co-founder of Bartlit Beck; represented George W. Bush before Supreme Court in Bush v. Gore
Dale Douglass (1936- ), professional golfer
Charlie Ergen (1953- ), founder of Dish Network
Vance Joseph (1972 - ), NFL coach
Case Keenum (1988 - ), NFL quarterback
Lew Kling, former fortune 500 CEO
Dave Liniger, Chairman of the Board and co-founder, RE/MAX
Ed McCaffery (1968- ), 2x Super Bowl champion

See also

Outline of Colorado
Index of Colorado-related articles
State of Colorado
Colorado cities and towns
Colorado census designated places
Colorado counties
Douglas County, Colorado
Colorado metropolitan areas
Front Range Urban Corridor
North Central Colorado Urban Area
Denver-Aurora-Boulder, CO Combined Statistical Area
Denver-Aurora-Broomfield, CO Metropolitan Statistical Area

References

External links

Castle Pines Homes Association
Castle Pines Metropolitan District
Castle Pines Golf Club
Country Club at Castle Pines
Douglas County website
Douglas County School District

Census-designated places in Douglas County, Colorado
Census-designated places in Colorado
Denver metropolitan area
Unincorporated communities in Douglas County, Colorado
Unincorporated communities in Colorado